Guy Maddin  (born February 28, 1956) is a Canadian screenwriter, director, author, cinematographer, and film editor of both features and short films, as well as an installation artist, from Winnipeg, Manitoba. Since completing his first film in 1985, Maddin has become one of Canada's most well-known and celebrated filmmakers.

Maddin has directed twelve feature films and numerous short films, in addition to publishing three books and creating a host of installation art projects. A number of Maddin's recent films began as or developed from installation art projects, and his books also relate to his film work. Maddin is known for his fascination with lost Silent-era films and for incorporating their aesthetics into his own work. Maddin has been the subject of much critical praise and academic attention, including two books of interviews with Maddin and two book-length academic studies of his work. Maddin was appointed to the Order of Canada, the country's highest civilian honour, in 2012.

Maddin first served as a visiting lecturer at Harvard University's Department of Art, Film, and Visual Studies in 2015. Until then, he had always lived in Winnipeg.

Life and career

Early life (1956–84) 
Guy Maddin was born in Winnipeg, Manitoba, Canada, to Herdis Maddin (a hairdresser) and Charles "Chas" Maddin (grain clerk and general manager of the Maroons, a Winnipeg hockey team). Maddin has three older siblings: Ross (b. 1944), Cameron (1946–63), and Janet (b. 1949). Maddin attended Winnipeg public schools— the Greenway School (elementary school), General Wolfe (junior high school), and the Daniel McIntyre Collegiate Institute (high school).

Maddin's early life was marked by tragedy—in February 1963, his brother Cameron killed himself on the grave of his girlfriend, who had died in a car accident. Maddin studied economics at the University of Winnipeg, graduating in 1977 without a plan to become a filmmaker. That same year, Maddin's father died suddenly after a stroke, and Maddin married Martha Jane Waugh. Their daughter, Jilian, was born in 1978, and Maddin and Waugh divorced in 1979.

After graduating, Maddin held a variety of odd jobs, including bank manager, house painter, and photo archivist. Maddin began to take film classes at the University of Manitoba. There, Maddin met film professor Stephen Snyder, who held regular film screenings of titles from the school's film library at his home. Maddin attended, as did some early collaborators, including his friend John Boles Harvie, the future star of Maddin's first film, and filmmaker John Paizs. Maddin appeared as an actor in two of Paizs' short films, as a student in Oak, Ivy, and Other Dead Elms (1982) and as a transvestite, homicidal nurse in The International Style (1983). Maddin drew early inspiration from the films of John Paizs, as well as experimental shorts by Stephen Snyder. Other early influences included L'Age d'Or by Luis Buñuel (in collaboration with Salvador Dalí) and Eraserhead by David Lynch. Maddin has stated that these films, along with the work of Paizs and Snyder, "were movies that were primitive in many respects. They were low budget, they used nonactors or nonstars, they used atmospheres and ideas, and were unbelievably honest, frank, and, therefore, exciting to me. They made moviemaking seem possible to me." Maddin also met film professor George Toles, who became Maddin's cowriter on many of his future films. Maddin's core group of friends from this period, who played various roles in the production of his early film projects, were known as "the Drones" and included Harvie, Ian Handford, and Kyle McCulloch (now a writer for South Park).

Maddin joined the Winnipeg Film Group around this time, and also became friends with producer Greg Klymkiw, with whom he began making a cable access television show, Survival (c. 1985–87). Survival was a satirical talk show centred around, as its opening credits noted, how "we must survive the inevitable social/economic collapse and/or nuclear holocaust". The show became a cult hit in Winnipeg and excerpts were re-released on the compilation DVD Winnipeg Babysitter. Maddin plays a masked character on the show named "Concerned Citizen Stan".

The Dead Father and Tales from the Gimli Hospital (1985–88) 
Maddin's first short film (as director, writer, producer, and cinematographer) was The Dead Father, a 25-minute black-and-white film about a young man whose father dies but continues to visit his family and disapprove of his son's life. Its budget is estimated at CA$5,000. Maddin began shooting The Dead Father in 1982 and finished the film in 1985. Spurred by the work of Snyder and Paizs, and together with Harvie and Handford, Maddin decided to begin making films and founded a film company called "Extra Large Productions" (they first decided on the name "Jumbo Productions" and went to get a jumbo pizza to celebrate, but changed the name when the pizzeria in Gimli, Manitoba, only served "extra large" pizzas).

Maddin cast John Harvie in the lead role as the son, and University of Manitoba medical professor Dr. Dan P. Snidal as the dead father. The Dead Father (1985) was shot in black-and-white on sixteen-millimetre film. The style of the film owes much to the work of the Surrealists, with Maddin citing Luis Buñuel and Man Ray as its main influences. Critics routinely cite, as an example of Maddin's dream-like tone, the climactic scene of the film, where the son attempts to resolve his relationship with his dead father by uncovering his corpse (hidden to sleep at night in some nearby brush) and attempting to devour his father using a large spoon—since the dead father awakens, the son cannot finish eating him and must instead pack his body away into a trunk in the family's attic. Although Maddin did not feel that the film's initial, Winnipeg premiere had gone well, John Paizs convinced him to submit the film to the Toronto Film Festival and the festival accepted the film. At the festival Maddin met Atom Egoyan, Jeremy Podeswa, Norman Jewison, and began to form connections with Canadian filmmakers across the national scene.

Maddin next began work on his feature film debut, Tales from the Gimli Hospital (1988), also shot in black-and-white on sixteen-millimetre film. Kyle McCulloch starred in the film as Einar, a lonely fisherman who contracts smallpox and begins to compete with another patient, Gunnar (played by Michael Gottli) for the attention of the young nurses. Maddin had himself endured a recent period of male rivalry and noticed that he found himself "quite often forgetting the object of jealousy" and instead becoming "possessive of my rival". The film was originally titled Gimli Saga after the amateur history book produced locally by various Icelandic members of the community of   Gimli (Maddin himself is Icelandic by ancestry).

Maddin's aunt Lil had recently retired from hairdressing, and allowed Maddin to use her beauty salon (also Maddin's childhood home) as a makeshift film studio (Lil appears in the film briefly as a "bedside vigil-sitter in one quick shot [taken] just a couple of days before she died" at the age of 85. After Maddin's mother sold the house/studio, Maddin completed the remaining shots of the film at various locations, including his own home, over a period of eighteen months. Maddin received a grant from the Manitoba Arts Council for CA$20,000, and often cites that figure as the film's budget, although he has also estimated the actual budget to have been between CA$14,000 and CA$30,000.

Although Tales from the Gimli Hospital upset some of the residents of Gimli, who believed that the film made light of the historical smallpox epidemic that ravaged the community, and was rejected by the Toronto Film Festival, it nevertheless became a cult success and established Maddin's reputation in independent film circles. The film garnered the attention of Ben Barenholtz, who had successfully distributed other cult films such as the John Waters film Pink Flamingos and David Lynch's debut feature Eraserhead. Tales from the Gimli Hospital consequently succeeded on the festival circuit and screened for a full year as a midnight movie at a theatre in New York's Greenwich Village. Maddin received a Genie award nomination for Best Original Screenplay.

Archangel, Careful, and Twilight of the Ice Nymphs (1989–97) 
Having proven himself as a filmmaker and established a reputation outside of Canada, Maddin began work on a series of feature films produced on larger budgets and more traditional production schedules and processes. His second feature, Archangel (1990), fictionalizes in a general sense historical conflict related to the Bolshevik Revolution occurring in the Arkhangelsk (Archangel) region of Russia, a basic concept presented to Maddin by John Harvie. Boles, a Canadian soldier suffering from amnesia, arrives in the town of Archangel as World War I is ending (due to the Bolshevik uprising, it appears as if the townspeople have, like Boles, contracted amnesia and "forgotten" that the war is over). Boles confuses the warrior-woman Veronkha with his lost love Iris and pursues her throughout the fighting. Fellow "drone" Kyle McCulloch stars as Boles. The film marks Maddin's first formal collaboration with fellow screenwriter George Toles.

Maddin shot Archangel in black-and-white, on 16 mm film, on a budget of CA$430,000. Maddin modeled the film on the style of a part-talkie, an early cinema genre. Film critic J. Hoberman praised the film, and noted that such stylistic approaches were typical of Maddin's growing body of work: "Maddin's most distinctive trait is an uncanny ability to exhume and redeploy forgotten cinematic  conventions." Archangel premiered at the Toronto Film Festival, and in 1991 was awarded Best Experimental Film by the National Society of Film Critics.

Maddin's third feature, Careful (1992), was styled after another early cinema genre, the German mountain picture (or Bergfilm) — a surprising choice, given that (as filmmaker Caelum Vatnsdal has noted), "Winnipeg's highest peak is, in fact, an artificial hill that had been created by laying sod over a garbage dump." Maddin was ordered by the producers to shoot in colour, and so Careful became Maddin's first colour film, shot on 16 mm film with a budget of CA$1.1 million. the colour style of the film emulated the two colour Technicolor movies of the early 1930s. Kyle McCulloch again starred, alongside other Maddin regulars such as Brent Neale and Ross McMillan. At one point, Martin Scorsese had agreed to act in the film, as Count Knotkers, but bowed out to complete Cape Fear. Maddin pursued casting hockey star Bobby Hull, but ended up casting Paul Cox.

Careful, also cowritten by George Toles, is set in the mountain town of Tolzbad, where the townspeople are forced to repress their behaviour pathologically, since the slightest expression of emotion can trigger a devastating avalanche. Brothers Grigorss (McCulloch) and Johann (Neale) seem secure of bright futures as butlers, but Johann becomes incestuously obsessed with their widowed mother (driving him away from his fiancé and towards a dramatic suicide). Grigorss, who is in love with Klara, begins to work for Count Knotkers, who also harbours love for Grigorss' mother. Klara convinces Grigorss to duel the Count, resulting in the death of his mother, Klara's father, Klara, and finally Grigorss himself. Careful premiered at the New York Film Festival and, although it was not a commercial success elsewhere, "single-handedly saved a struggling art-house cinema in Missoula, Montana" where "sell-out crowds had filled the house twice every night for two weeks".

For his next feature film, written by Toles, Maddin attempted to make an operetta called The Dikemaster's Daughter "set in a nineteenth-century Holland populated almost entirely by opera singers and dike-building navvies" about "a short-lived romance between the titular daughter and a fey opera singer". The singer is killed and the daughter is forced to marry a dike-builder who is also killed. A local alchemist then constructs an automaton copy of the latter, which the daughter succeeds in having implanted with two hearts (of both her opera singer love and her dike-builder husband) and a lever that switches control of the mechanical body between the two hearts. The movie was to feature Christopher Lee and Leni Riefenstahl, but Telefilm Canada "declared the project a 'lateral move'" for Maddin and the movie could not secure enough funding, so was aborted.

Maddin consequently flirted with the idea of moving to Los Angeles to become a director-for-hire. He met with Claudia Lewis, who worked for Fox Searchlight, but Maddin found himself dispirited with the projects he was offered: "I remember one was a love story set in a TB sanatorium. The only thing odd or bizarre about it was the very off-putting sight of people horking up blood and phlegm into little paper cups, and these paper cups would accumulate in volume until there were moonlit paper cups of phlegm floating on a lake, and it was supposed to be very beautiful, but it was nauseating. I'm making it sound better than it was, actually." Maddin also directed the TV film The Hands of Ida (which he "later repudiated") and married Elise Moore in 1995 (the marriage ended in 1997), and directed the short film Odilon Redon, or The Eye Like a Strange Balloon Mounts Toward Infinity (which was commissioned by the BBC and won a Special Jury Citation at the Toronto International Film festival). In 1995, Maddin also became the youngest recipient ever of the Telluride Film Festival's Lifetime Achievement Award.

Maddin's fourth feature, also scripted by Toles and inspired by the novel Pan by Knut Hamsun, ended up being Twilight of the Ice Nymphs (1997), his second in colour and his first shot in 35 mm, on a budget of CA$1.5 million. Set in the fictional land of Mandragora, where the sun does not set, a newly released convict returns to his family's ostrich farm and is embroiled in a host of romantic complications involving a heavy-breasted statue of Venus. Twilight of the Ice Nymphs featured Shelley Duvall and Frank Gorshin; The film's star, Nigel Whitmey, had his name removed from the film's credits after Maddin chose to remove Whitmey's voice from the film and replace it with Ross McMillan's.

As seen in Noam Gonick's documentary Waiting for Twilight, Maddin was dissatisfied with the film-making process due to such creative interference from his producers, saying "just close the mausoleum lid on me" since he was possibly done making films. Maddin then entered a relatively "fallow period" although he continued to make short films, music videos (including the video for the song "It's a Wonderful Life" by Sparklehorse), and advertisements.

The Heart of the World, Dracula: Pages from a Virgin's Diary, The Saddest Music in the World (1998–2003) 
During his break from making feature films, Maddin began teaching film classes at the University of Manitoba, where he met and encouraged the younger filmmaker Deco Dawson. After being impressed with Dawson's short films, Maddin hired Dawson to work on a short film for the Toronto International Film Festival — Maddin was one of a number of directors (including Atom Egoyan and David Cronenberg) commissioned to make four-minute short films that would screen prior to the various feature films at the 2000 festival. After hearing rumours that other directors were planning films with a small number of shots, Maddin decided that his film would instead contain over a hundred shots per minute, and enough plot for a feature-length film. Maddin then wrote and shot The Heart of the World (2000) in the style of Russian constructivism, taking the commission at its literal face value, as a call to produce a propaganda film. The plot of The Heart of the World concerns two brothers, Osip and Nikolai, who compete for the love of the same woman: Anna, a state scientist studying Earth's core. Anna discovers that the heart of the world is in danger of a fatal heart attack (which would mean the end of the world), and the brothers compete amongst the public panic. Nikolai is a mortician and tries to impress Anna with assembly-line embalming, while Osip is an actor playing Christ in the Passion Play and tries to impress Anna through his suffering. Anna is instead seduced by an evil capitalist, but has a change of heart and strangles the plutocrat, then slides down into the heart of the world, where she manages to save the world from destruction by transforming into cinema itself, the world's "new and better heart — Kino!" The Heart of the World won a 2001 Genie Award for Best Short, and the 2001 U.S. National Society of Film Critics Award for Best Experimental Film (the same award Maddin had won in 1991 for Archangel).

The success of The Heart of the World marked the beginning of a productive period for Maddin, who produced five feature films within the following eight years. Maddin's next feature deepened but also ended his collaboration with Deco Dawson, who was credited as "Editor and Associate Director" on Dracula: Pages from a Virgin's Diary (2002). Maddin and Dawson had a falling out in the wake of the production and have not worked together again (Dawson nevertheless spoke kindly of Maddin's following feature, The Saddest Music in the World. Dracula: Pages from a Virgin's Diary was budgeted at $1.7-million and produced for the Canadian Broadcasting Corporation (CBC) as a dance film documenting a performance by the Royal Winnipeg Ballet adapting Bram Stoker's novel Dracula. Maddin elected to shoot the dance film in a fashion uncommon for such films, through close-ups and using jump cuts. Maddin also stayed close to the source material of Stoker's novel, emphasizing the xenophobia in the reactions of the main characters to Dracula (played by Zhang Wei-Qiang in Maddin's film). The resulting film was greeted with critical acclaim, with an 84% average rating on Metacritic and an 85% "Fresh" rating on Rotten Tomatoes. Roger Ebert gave the film 3½ stars out of 4, writing that "so many films are more or less alike that it's jolting to see a film that deals with a familiar story, but looks like no other." Dracula: Pages from a Virgin's Diary won first prize (Prague D'Or) at the 2002 Golden Prague Television Festival, two 2002 Gemini Awards for Best Canadian Performing Arts Show and Best Direction, and a 2002 International Emmy for Best Performing Arts. Originally a television feature, Dracula: Pages from a Virgin's Diary was released theatrically in 2003.

Maddin's next feature, The Saddest Music in the World (2003) was budgeted at $3.8-million (a large budget in Canadian terms) and shot over 24 days. The film was Maddin's first collaboration with Isabella Rossellini, who subsequently appeared in a number of Maddin's films, and cocreated a film with him about her father Roberto Rossellini. The film also starred Mark McKinney (of the comedy troupe Kids in the Hall), Maria de Medeiros, David Fox, and Ross McMillan. Maddin and cowriter Toles based the film on an original screenplay written by Booker Prize-winning novelist Kazuo Ishiguro, from which they kept "the title, the premise and the contest – to determine which country's music was the saddest" but otherwise re-wrote. The action of The Saddest Music in the World centres around a contest run by Beer Baroness Lady Port-Huntley (Rossellini) to discover which country has the saddest music in the world. Chester Kent (McKinney), a failed Broadway producer, returns home to Winnipeg and competes with his father Fyodor (Fox) and brother Roderick (McMillan) to win the contest and its $25,000 prize. It's discovered that Chester's girlfriend, Narcissa (de Medeiros) was Roderick's wife but forgot this due to amnesia resulting from the death of their son (Roderick keeps his son's heart in a jar that travels with him). Chester reunites with Port-Huntley, his former lover, who lost her legs in a car accident. Fyodor, who is in love with Port-Huntley, has built prosthetic legs for her out of glass (and filled with beer), which she loves although she spurns Fyodor, leading to his drunken death. As the contest proceeds, things end tragically. The Saddest Music in the World won a number of awards, including three Genie Awards (Best Achievement in Costume Design, Best Achievement in Editing, and Best Achievement in Music, Original Score) and Maddin was also nominated for Best Achievement in Direction. Maddin received the same nomination from the Directors Guild of Canada, who awarded the film Outstanding Achievement in Production Design, Feature Film, and Maddin won the Film Discovery Jury Award for Best Director at the U.S. Comedy Arts Festival.

Cowards Bend the Knee, Brand Upon the Brain!, My Winnipeg (2003–07) 
While in pre-production on The Saddest Music in the World, Maddin directed Cowards Bend the Knee (2003), shooting entirely on Super-8mm film with a budget of $30,000. Developed as a series of short films, commissioned as part of an installation art project by Toronto art gallery The Power Plant that was curated by Philip Monk, these 10 short films, collected together, constituted a short feature, so that Maddin ended up completing and releasing two feature films in 2003. Cowards Bend the Knee is the first in Maddin's "autobiographical 'Me Trilogy'" of feature films starring protagonists named "Guy Maddin", the second being Brand Upon the Brain! (2006) and My Winnipeg (2007). Cowards Bend the Knee concerns the murderous exploits of a young "Guy Maddin" (played by Darcy Fehr), a hockey player whose forgets his beloved as she dies through complications during an illegal abortion. Guy becomes entwined in a love affair with the daughter of the abortionist, who compels him to murder her mother to revenge the death of her father. Guy meanwhile falls in love with the ghost of his dead lover, not recognizing her, and competes with his own father for her affection. Maddin based the film's premise loosely on the story The Hands of Ida and Euripedes's play Medea. Critic J. Hoberman of The Village Voice called the film "Maddin's masterpiece", noting that the film "not only plays like a dream but feels like one".

Maddin was next approached by the Seattle-based not-for-profit film production company called The Film Company and offered a budget to make any film he wanted, with complete freedom as long as he shot it in Seattle with local actors. Maddin ended up producing Brand Upon the Brain! (2006), from a script cowritten by Toles, shooting the film over nine days and editing it over three months with an estimated budget of $40,000. The plot concerns "Guy Maddin" (played by Erik Steffen Maahs as an adult, and Sullivan Brown as a child), whose domineering mother runs a lighthouse orphanage on an island where she and her husband perform scientific experiments upon the children in an effort to extend her youth. Brand Upon the Brain! was shot as a silent film, and premiered at the 2006 Toronto International Film Festival, where it was accompanied by a live orchestra, singer, an interlocutor (in the style of Japanese benshi), and Foley artists. The film was toured across North America in a similar fashion, with a host of celebrity narrators including Crispin Glover and John Ashbery. The film's normal theatrical run featured narration by Isabella Rossellini. In 2006, Maddin was presented with two lifetime achievement awards, the Persistence of Vision Award from the San Francisco International Film Festival and the Manitoba Arts Council's Award of Distinction. Roger Ebert wrote, of the film and Maddin's work in general, that "For me, Maddin seems to penetrate to the hidden layers beneath the surface of the movies, revealing a surrealistic underworld of fears, fantasies and obsessions."

Maddin's next feature stemmed from a commission to produce a documentary film about his hometown of Winnipeg, for which Maddin's producer directed "Don't give me the frozen hellhole everyone knows that Winnipeg is." Taking what he described as a "docufantasia" approach that melded "personal history, civic tragedy, and mystical hypothesizing", Maddin produced My Winnipeg (2008), with a budget of $500,000. Maddin re-cast Darcy Fehr in the role of "Guy Maddin" and structured the documentary around a metafictional plot whereby "Guy Maddin" attempts to "film his way out" of the frozen city. Maddin rents out his former home and hires actors to play his family (including Ann Savage as his mother) in the recreation of pivotal scenes from his memories of youth. Along the way, Maddin documents facts, rumours, and fabricated myths about Winnipeg, including the demolition of the Winnipeg hockey arena (during the period after the sale of the Winnipeg Jets had left the city without a national hockey team), an epidemic of sleepwalking, the ghosts of frozen horse heads returning every winter when the rivers freeze over, and If Day (an actual historical event when a faked Nazi invasion of the city was mounted during World War II to promote the sale of war bonds). My Winnipeg received the award for Best Canadian Feature Film from the 2007 Toronto International Film Festival, Best Documentary from the 2008 San Francisco Film Critics Circle Awards, Best Canadian Film from the 2008 Toronto Film Critics Association Awards, and Best Experimental Documentary from the 2009 International Urban Film Festival, Tehran. In 2007, Maddin also became the first artist-curator of the UCLA Film and Television Archive.

Keyhole, Hauntings, Seances, The Forbidden Room and The Green Fog (2008–2017) 
Maddin soon received two other career awards, the Filmmaker on the Edge Award at the 2009 Provincetown International Film Festival and the 2010 Canada Council for the Arts Bell Award in Video Art for lifetime achievement in the field. Maddin then returned to installation art with a commission to celebrate the opening of the Bell Lightbox cultural centre in Toronto, producing an installation series titled Hauntings based on the concept of reimagining lost films from the silent film era that are known to have existed or been planned by influential filmmakers, but either destroyed or not produced. In December 2010, Maddin married the L.A. film critic Kim Morgan, and they separated in 2014.

Maddin shot his tenth feature film, Keyhole (2011), digitally rather than his usual method of shooting on sixteen-millimetre or Super-8. Filming began in Winnipeg on July 6, 2010. The film screened at the 2011 Toronto International Film Festival and the 2011 Whistler Film Festival, where it won the Best Canadian Film Award. In 2012, Keyhole screened at the South by Southwest Film Festival, the Independent Film Festival of Boston, the Wisconsin Film Festival, Fantasporto, and the Berlin International Film Festival. The film was released theatrically in 2012. Keyhole stars Jason Patric as Ulysses Pick, a gangster who leads his gang to break into his former home and odysseys through the haunted house (in a plot inspired by Homer's Odyssey), searching room-by-room to find his wife Hyacinth Isabella Rossellini. The film was cowritten by Maddin and Toles and also stars Udo Kier, Brooke Palsson, David Wontner, Louis Negin, and Kevin McDonald from the comedy troupe Kids in the Hall.

In 2012, Maddin produced another installation for the Winnipeg Art Gallery, Only Dream Things, for which he recreated his childhood bedroom and produced a short film by manipulating his family's home movies.

Maddin expanded the approach of his Hauntings installation into another film/installation project, Seances, which combines "a film shoot, an experience and an installation, which will subsequently become an interactive work". Maddin started shooting Seances in 2012 in Paris, France at the Centre Georges Pompidou and continued shooting at the Phi Centre in Montreal, Quebec, Canada. The film shoots themselves were presented as art installation projects, during which Maddin, along with the cast and crew, held a "séance" during which Maddin "invite[d] the spirit of a lost photoplay to possess them". Seances will be launched online by the National Film Board of Canada in 2015, in an interactive web project that allows users to  randomly generate a combination of the 100 short films, "connected together into a paranormally eerie, semi-coherent whole." The number of films will ensure "hundreds of billions of unique permutations".

Maddin and Galen Johnson also co-directed and shot, concurrently, a feature film titled The Forbidden Room, with the same writers. Although often misreported as the same project, The Forbidden Room "is a feature film with its own separate story and stars" while "Seances will be an interactive Internet project." The Forbidden Room is Maddin's eleventh feature film, with its world premiere in January 2015 at the Sundance Film Festival.

Maddin's most recent feature film, The Green Fog (2017), premiered at the San Francisco International Film Festival on April 16, 2017. The film features a score by composer Jacob Garchik, performed by Kronos Quartet, and is a collage-film, "a scene-by-scene reimagining of Alfred Hitchcock's Vertigo  Bay Area film footage from a variety of sources — '50s noir, experimental films, '70s prime-time TV, and more."

Installations 
Guy Maddin has cultivated a career as an installation artist alongside his film-making career. Maddin's installations generally include short films screened in unusual fashions, and tend to draw on both his autobiography and on the history of cinema.

Cowards Bend the Knee (2003) 
Maddin was commissioned by The Power Plant gallery in Toronto and, in an installation curated by Philip Monk, produced a series of ten short films. The exhibition premiered at the 42nd International Film Festival Rotterdam from January 22 to February 2, 2003, where the catalogue described it as "A firstofitskind, tenpart peephole installation jampacked with enough kinetically photographed action to seem like a neverending cliffhanger." Each six-minute film is viewed through a peephole and together present a fictionalised autobiography, whose main character (named "Guy Maddin") is embroiled in illegal abortion, murderous intrigue, sexual rivalry, and hockey. The installation was also exhibited at The Power Plant Contemporary Art Gallery in Toronto from March 22 to May 25, 2003. A literary screenplay for the film was also published by the gallery, and the short films were collected together as a feature film (released theatrically and to DVD).

Hauntings (2010) 
Maddin was commissioned to produce an installation for the opening of the Toronto International Film Festival's Bell Lightbox, a cultural centre and skyscraper, and configured eleven screens to show a series of original short films. The films consisted of reimagined "lost" films by famous directors that have been lost, destroyed or unrealized. Maddin stated in the press that "I've been literally haunted by the idea that there are these really intriguing titles by some of my favourite filmmakers that I'd never get to see [... and] I told myself years ago that the only way I'd get to see any version of these is if I made the adaptation myself." The installation was also exhibited at Winnipeg's Platform Gallery from September 2 to October 2, 2011, for the WNDX Festival of Moving Image and at Concordia University's FOFA (Faculty of Fine Arts) Gallery from June 1–10, 2012.

Only Dream Things (2012) 
For a 2012 installation at the Winnipeg Art Gallery, Maddin re-created his teenage bedroom. On the wall of the re-created bedroom screens a 19-minute short film Maddin produced by digitally distressing his family's home movies.

Seances (2012–2015) 
Expanding the approach of his Hauntings installation, Maddin's ongoing film/installation project, Seances. The film shoots were open to the public and streamed online, and thereby presented as live art installation projects, during which Maddin, along with the cast and crew, held a séance "invit[ing] the spirit of a lost photoplay to possess them". The cameras used to record the shoots also live-streams their video online. Other writers on the project include Evan Johnson, Robert Kotyk, film critic Kim Morgan, and US poet John Ashbery. In 2015, the Maddin and National Film Board of Canada will release "Seances [as] an interactive Internet project".

Books by Maddin 
Guy Maddin is also an author, and has published three books, two of which are literary companions to his feature films.

From the Atelier Tovar: Selecting Writings (2003) 
Guy Maddin's first book (followed the same year by Cowards Bend the Knee) contains selected "journalism, treatments for films made and unmade and [. . .] selection[s] from the director's [. . .] personal journals" and also "candid photos and unpublished storyboards". The book is introduced by film critic Mark Peranson and published by Coach House Books.

Maddin's journalism features reviews of a variety of films, from Minority Report to The Seven Samurai, an article on the making of Maddin's feature The Saddest Music in the World, and writing on Bollywood melodramas. The book contains four film treatments, for the short films The Eye, Like a Strange Balloon, Mounts Towards Infinity, Maldoror:Tygers, and the feature film Careful. The longest treatment is for an unmade film called The Child Without Qualities, an autobiographical work that reads like an experimental short story. This unfinished short film's title alludes to the title of Robert Musil's unfinished novel The Man Without Qualities.

Cowards Bend the Knee (2003) 
Guy Maddin wrote a lengthy treatment for the feature film Cowards Bend the Knee, which he published as a book through The Power Plant, the public art gallery in Toronto that commissioned the installation art show that both served as Maddin's first major foray as an installation artist and for which Maddin produced the series of film "chapters" that collectively make up the feature film.

The book contains a foreword by Wayne Baerwaldt (then-Director of The Power Plant) and an introduction by Philip Monk, who also edited the book and curated Maddin's installation. The main text is followed by an interview with Guy Maddin conducted by Robert Enright. The book also contains stills from the film and a list of credits for the film.

Most of the text is Maddin's treatment for the film, which follows the same plot. In the words of Baerwaldt, the story is a fictional "autobiography [that] features a diabolical plot surrounding a coward on a mission [named Guy Maddin] that resembles a cycle of dark spectacles dressed up as, among other things, lewd seduction, Canadian hockey, murder, amputations, hair design, general mayhem, fetish attractions and heartfelt loss."

In the interview with Enright, Maddin notes that the book's genesis began with Maddin's intention to clarify the narrative of his films, since "it is a source of continuing frustration that people would say --- and it was always a compliment --- we really like your films, they're so non-narrative. So I thought, damnit, I'm going to get a story that people are going to recognize, something that has legs. I started reading Greek tragedy, Electra, Medea and stuff like that, and basically I just took some premises from these super-durable stories. The things I end up layering around these rock-solid premises are invariably pure autobiography [. . .] once I slipped away what little remained of Euripides, what was left was some core sample of me."

Maddin's book treatment is written in a highly literary fashion that is not typical of screen treatments, so that the text reads like a literary work rather than a blueprint for the film: "It is the night before the [Winnipeg] Maroons' first game against the Soviets. Meta and Guy lie in bed, in the midst of a particularly spectacular recital of what could be called THE LIMBO-DANCE OF SELF-PITY --- a verbal choreography performed by lovers who manipulate each other through complicated displays of insincere self-loathing. Participants enter the Limbo in hopes of restructuring the unspoken terms of their relationship."

My Winnipeg (2009) 
Guy Maddin also released a book titled My Winnipeg (Coach House Books, 2009). Maddin's book contains the film's narration as a main text surrounded by annotations, including outtakes, marginal notes and digressions, production stills, family photos, and miscellaneous material.

The book contains a "Winnipeg Map" by artist Marcel Dzama featuring such fictional attractions as "The Giant Squid of the Red [River]", various poster designs for the film, and short articles about working with Maddin by Andy Smetanka, Darcy Fehr, and Caelum Vatnsdal. Maddin also includes an angry e-mail from an ex-girlfriend, collages and notebooks pages, and an X-ray of the dog Spanky from the film.

The book also includes an interview with Maddin's mother Herdis, conducted by Ann Savage, and an interview with Maddin conducted by Michael Ondaatje.

Books about Maddin 
Maddin's work has been the subject of critical attention, including the following substantive (book-length) works.

William Beard: Into the Past: The Cinema of Guy Maddin 
William Beard, a professor in the Department of English and Film Studies at the University of Alberta, authored a critical book focused on Maddin's work up until 2010, focusing chapter-by-chapter on Maddin's feature films and also discussing his short film work. Beard previously published books focused on filmmakers Clint Eastwood and David Cronenberg.

David Church: Playing with Memories: Essays on Guy Maddin 
David Church, a film historian affiliated with Indiana University, edited a collection of essays about Maddin's work through 2009. The book contains both new and previously published essays by critics and scholars, including William Beard, Dana Cooley, Donald Masterson, David L. Pike, Steven Shaviro, Will Straw, Saige Walton, and others. Essays by several of Maddin's friends and collaborators, including George Toles, Stephen Snyder, and Carl Matheson, are also included.

D.K. Holm: Guy Maddin: Interviews 
D. K. Holm edited a collection of interviews with Maddin, selected from various sources, including the more comprehensive interview book by Vatnsdal. Holm also selects excerpts from Maddin's DVD commentaries.

Caelum Vatnsdal: Kino Delirium: The Films of Guy Maddin 
Caelum Vatnsdal, a director, producer, author, and actor (who has appeared in a number of Maddin's films, most notably in The Heart of the World), published a book of interviews with Maddin discussing his filmography film-by-film (the book covers Maddin's career up to 2000).

Darren Wershler: Guy Maddin's My Winnipeg 
Darren Wershler, a Canadian avant-garde poet, critic, and assistant professor in the Department of English at Concordia University, has published an academic monograph on My Winnipeg. This book-length work contextualizes the film in relation to avant-garde literature and art by drawing on media and cultural theory. In Wershler's words, "I argue that Maddin's use of techniques and media falls outside of the normal repertoire of contemporary cinema, which requires us to re-examine what we think we know about the documentary genre and even 'film' itself. Through an exploration of the film's major thematic concerns – memory, the cultural archive, and how people and objects circulate through the space of the city – I contend that My Winnipeg is intriguing because it is psychologically and affectively true without being historically accurate." In the context of its Canadian production, My Winnipeg'''s difference from the documentary genre also marks the film as distinct from the work historically advanced by the National Film Board of Canada. Maddin has called My Winnipeg a "docu-fantasia" and Wershler similarly points out that the film's "truth" lies somewhere "in the irresolvable tension created by the gap between documentary and melodrama".

 Awards 
 1991—U.S. National Society of Film Critics Award for Best Experimental Film for Archangel.
 1995—Telluride Medal for lifetime achievement in film at the Telluride Film Festival.
 2001—U.S. National Society of Film Critics Award for Best Experimental Film for Heart of the World.
 2001—Genie Award for Best Short for Heart of the World.
 2002—International Emmy for Best Performing Arts for Dracula: Pages from a Virgin's Diary.
 2002—Gemini Awards for Best Canadian Performing Arts Show and Best Direction for Dracula: Pages from a Virgin's Diary.
 2002—Prague D'Or (first prize) at the Golden Prague Television Festival for Dracula: Pages from a Virgin's Diary.
 2006—Persistence of Vision Award for lifetime achievement in film given out at San Francisco International Film Festival.
 2006—Manitoba Arts Council's Award of Distinction for lifetime achievement in the arts.
 2007—City TV Prize for Best Canadian Film at the Toronto International Film Festival for My Winnipeg.
 2008—Toronto Film Critics Association Best Canadian Film for My Winnipeg.
 2009—Filmmaker on the Edge Award at the Provincetown International Film Festival.
 2010—The Canada Council for the Arts Bell Award in Video Art, for lifetime achievement in the field.
 2018—Golden Lady Harimaguada Award from the Las Palmas de Gran Canaria International Film Festival for The Green Fog 2018—Los Angeles Film Critics Association Awards, The Douglas Edwards Experimental Film Award for The Green Fog Filmography 
 Feature films 

 Short films 

 References 

 Further reading 
 Beard, William. Into the Past: The Cinema of Guy Maddin. Toronto: U of Toronto P, 2010. Print. 
 Church, David, ed. Playing with Memories: Essays on Guy Maddin. Winnipeg: U of Manitoba P, 2009. 
 Holm, D.K., ed. Guy Maddin: Interviews. Jackson: U of Mississippi P, 2010. Print. 
 Maddin, Guy. Cowards Bend the Knee. Toronto: The Power Plant, 2003. Print. 
 Maddin, Guy. From the Atelier Tovar: Selected Writings. Toronto: Coach House Books, 2003. Print. 
 Maddin, Guy. My Winnipeg. Toronto: Coach House Books, 2009. Print. 
 Vatnsdal, Caelum. Kino Delirium: The Films of Guy Maddin. Winnipeg: Arbeiter Ring Publishing, 2000. Print. 
 Wershler, Darren. Guy Maddin's My Winnipeg''. Toronto: U of Toronto P, 2010. Print.

External links 
 Guy Maddin Official Site
 
 Transplant, Consumption, Death, Or: Disease, pathology and decay in Guy Maddin’s cinema
 Canadian Encyclopedia entry on Guy Maddin
 Conversations with Guy Maddin (by film professor William Beard

Living people
Canadian cinematographers
Canadian experimental filmmakers
Canadian male screenwriters
Directors of Genie and Canadian Screen Award winners for Best Live Action Short Drama
Film directors from Winnipeg
Members of the Order of Manitoba
Writers from Winnipeg
Silent film directors
University of Winnipeg alumni
Artists from Winnipeg
Members of the Order of Canada
Canadian people of Icelandic descent
1956 births
Postmodernist filmmakers
20th-century Canadian screenwriters
20th-century Canadian male writers
21st-century Canadian screenwriters
21st-century Canadian male writers